HMS St. Kitts was a  of the Royal Navy (RN). She was named in honour of the Battle of St. Kitts which took place in 1782. So far she has been the only ship of the Royal Navy to bear the name.  St. Kitts was built by Swan Hunter & Wigham Richardson Limited on the Tyne. She was launched on 4 October 1944 and commissioned on 21 January 1946.

Service
St. Kitts joined the 5th Destroyer Flotilla of the Home Fleet upon commission. In 1948, St. Kitts deployed to the Arctic to join the aircraft carrier , along with a variety of other ships, including other Battle-class destroyers during experiments in that region. In 1953, St. Kitts took part in the large Fleet Review at Spithead to celebration the Coronation of Queen Elizabeth II. St. Kitts was subsequently placed in Reserve.

In 1954, St. Kitts joined the 3rd Destroyer Flotilla, also part of the Home Fleet.  In 1955, St. Kitts, still with the 3rd Flotilla, deployed to the Mediterranean, and took part in the Suez Crisis, which had occurred after the nationalisation of the Suez Canal by the Egyptian leader Nasser. During Operation Musketeer, the invasion of Egypt, St. Kitts performed a variety of duties, including escorting the carrier , as well as participating in the naval bombardment of Port Said. That same year, St. Kitts, along with the rest of the Flotilla, left the Mediterranean to join the Home Fleet.

Decommissioning and disposal
In 1957, St. Kitts was decommissioned, being scrapped in 1962 at Sunderland.

References

Publications
 
 

 

Battle-class destroyers of the Royal Navy
Ships built on the River Tyne
1944 ships
Cold War destroyers of the United Kingdom